Koton Karfe (Egbura igu) is the headquarters of Kogi Local Government in Kogi State, Nigeria and is located on latitude 8.1046°N and longitude 6.7976°E and in the northern part of the Nigeria between Lokoja and Abuja.
Koton Karfe is predominantly inhabited by the Egbura Kotos even though other tribes (Ebiras, Yorubas, Igbos, Bassas, Nupes etc.) can be found in small proportions all over the community.
The community's traditional government is overseen by the Ohimegye (saluted Agaba Idu!) and is assisted in governance by his chiefs, prominent men from all over the kingdom.
A democratically elected chairman heads the Local Government's Area Council
.

References 

Populated places in Kogi State